Sangram may refer to:
 Sampada Gramin Mahila Sanstha (SANGRAM)
 Sangram (1946 film), a 1946 Tamil film
 Sangram (1950 film), a 1950 Hindi film
 Sangram (1968 film), a 1968 Assamese film
 Sangram (1974 film), a 1974 Bengali war film
 Sangram (1993 film), a 1993 Hindi film
 Sangram (2005 film), a 2005 Bengali thriller film
 The Daily Sangram, or Dainik Sangram, a Bangladeshi newspaper